Alexander Nikitich Vilboa (1716 – 9 February 1781) was the eighth  of the Imperial Russian Army, who served with distinction during the Seven Years' War.

Biography
Vilboa was born in Derpt as the youngest son of Rear Admiral Nikita Vilboa, the former commandant of the port of Kronstadt, a participant in the wars during Peter the Great's reign, and Elizabeth Gluck (d. 1757), daughter of Pastor Ernst Gluck and the lady of the court. In 1742, he took part in the war with Sweden, in 1744, he was granted, with the rank of colonel, a rank of chamberlain at the court of Empress Elizabeth Petrovna. In 1755, he was promoted to major general, in 1758 – to lieutenant general.

Since the beginning of the Seven Years' War, in the army, he distinguished himself at Gross–Jägersdorf, where he was seriously wounded. For Gross–Jägersdorf he was awarded the Order of Saint Alexander Nevsky. Participant of the Siege of Kustrin, the Battle of Palzig. In the Battle of Kunersdorf he commanded the vanguard of the Russian Army, occupied Frankfurt on the Oder. Also inducted into the Imperial Council.

According to the biographer's testimony, the abundance and volume of resolutions with which he supplied all the submissions that came to him on all four departments entrusted to him as : artillery, engineering, weapons and cadet corps, are amazing. Many of them contain "whole instructions and provisions, most of them extremely useful and fully resolving all difficulties". Vilboa's activities as General Feldtsheichmeister promised to be very fruitful, but in 1765, he was forced to ask for resignation for health reasons: the consequences of a serious injury affected.

As a deputy from the Livonian Province, he took part in the work of the Legislative Commission.

Alexander Vilboa died on 9 February 1781 at his Sarrakus estate and was buried there. Part of his estate was inherited by his grandson .

References

1716 births
1781 deaths
People of the Seven Years' War
Burials in Estonia